The 2007 World Senior Curling Championships were held from March 25 to 31 at the Thistle Curling Club in Edmonton, Alberta, Canada. Scotland won the men's event and Sweden the women's. 

Scotland's Keith Prentice rink won the men's event when Prentice "made a pretty amazing shot" by bumping back a buried Canadian stone on the button to score a point in the eighth and final end in the final.

Men

Round Robin Standings

Playoffs

Women

Round Robin Standings

Tiebreakers
 10-9 
 5-3

Playoffs

References

External links
Women's results
Men's results

World Senior Curling Championships
2007 in Canadian curling
2007 in Alberta
International curling competitions hosted by Canada
Curling competitions in Edmonton
2000s in Edmonton
March 2007 sports events in Canada